Sittin' at a Bar is a repackaging of Rehab's 2000 studio album Southern Discomfort,  with a shuffled track listing. Epic Records put it out to capitalize on the success of the song "Sittin' at a Bar" which had been re-recorded and released as a single by the band's new label, Universal.

Track list
 "Sittin' At A Bar" (3:37)
 "Hey Fred" (3:58)
 "Storm Chaser" (feat. Cee-Lo Green & Big Gipp of Goodie Mob) (3:30)
 "Crazy People" (3:10)
 "Scarecrow" (3:41)
 "It Don't Matter" (3:40)
 "Drinkin' Problem" (feat. Steaknife) (3:34)
 "Rattle My Cage" (3:05)
 "More Like You" (feat. Mandy Lauderdale) (3:49)
 "Miss Jones" (3:36)
 "Thinkin Again" (4:50)
 "Kick My Ass" (4:11)
 "Sittin' At A Bar (Karaoke Version)" (3:38)

Rehab (band) albums
2008 albums
Epic Records albums